Omorgus rotundulus is a species of hide beetle in the subfamily Omorginae.

References

rotundulus
Beetles described in 1957